Giorgio Croci (born 19 April 1893, date of death unknown) was an Italian sprinter. He competed in the men's 100 metres at the 1920 Summer Olympics.

References

External links
 

1893 births
Year of death missing
Athletes (track and field) at the 1920 Summer Olympics
Italian male sprinters
Olympic athletes of Italy
Place of birth missing